

Incumbents
Monarch: Hans

Events

Alvsson's rebellion: The Tønsberg Fortress was destroyed by rebels.

Arts and literature

Births
 August 12 – Christian III of Denmark and Norway (d. 1559)

Deaths

References